The Pennsylvania State Game Lands Number 34 are Pennsylvania State Game Lands in Clearfield County in Pennsylvania in the United States providing hunting, bird watching, and other activities.

Geography
State Game Lands Number 34 is located in Covington and Girard Townships in Clearfield County, and in Benezette and Jay Townships in Elk County. Nearby communities include Census-designated places Byrnedale, Force and Weedville, as well as unincorporated communities Benezette, Caledonia, Huntley, Medix Run, Scattertown and Tyler.

Nearby highways include Pennsylvania Routes 255, 555 and 879.

All the parcels of SGL 34 lie within the West Branch Susquehanna River and Susquehanna River watersheds. Streams include Johnson Run and Silvermill Hollow Run both which drain to Bennett Branch Sinnemahoning Creek, then Sinnemahoning Creek. Jack Dent Branch flows to Medix Run, then the Bennett Branch. Mosquito Creek flows through SGL 34 and collects effluent from Gifford Run, McNerney Run, Panther run and Pebble Run, then flowing to the West Branch Susquehanna River.

Protected areas within 30 miles include:

National Forests 
Allegheny National Forest

State Parks 
Black Moshannon State Park
Bucktail State Park Natural Area
Elk State Park
Kettle Creek State Park
Parker Dam State Park
S. B. Elliott State Park
Sizerville State Park

State Forests 
Sproul State Forest

Pennsylvania State Game Lands 
Pennsylvania State Game Lands Number 14
Pennsylvania State Game Lands Number 25
Pennsylvania State Game Lands Number 30
Pennsylvania State Game Lands Number 33
Pennsylvania State Game Lands Number 44
Pennsylvania State Game Lands Number 54
Pennsylvania State Game Lands Number 77
Pennsylvania State Game Lands Number 78
Pennsylvania State Game Lands Number 87
Pennsylvania State Game Lands Number 90
Pennsylvania State Game Lands Number 94
Pennsylvania State Game Lands Number 98
Pennsylvania State Game Lands Number 100
Pennsylvania State Game Lands Number 103
Pennsylvania State Game Lands Number 195
Pennsylvania State Game Lands Number 293
Pennsylvania State Game Lands Number 311
Pennsylvania State Game Lands Number 321
Pennsylvania State Game Lands Number 331

Statistics
SGL 34 was entered into the Geographic Names Information System on 2 August 1979 as identification number 1188511.
 in four parcels centered around coordinates  See the infobox for coordinates of individual parcels.

See also
Pennsylvania State Game Lands

References

034
Protected areas of Clearfield County, Pennsylvania